Francesco de Caprusacci (died 1494) was a Roman Catholic prelate who served as Bishop of Umbriatico (1475–1494).

Biography
On 3 Mar 1475, Francesco de Caprusacci was appointed during the papacy of Pope Sixtus IV as Bishop of Umbriatico.
He served as Bishop of Umbriatico until his death in 1494.

References

External links and additional sources
 (for Chronology of Bishops) 
 (for Chronology of Bishops) 

15th-century Italian Roman Catholic bishops
Bishops appointed by Pope Sixtus IV
1494 deaths